The 1985 Chicago Cubs season was the 114th season of the Chicago Cubs franchise, the 110th in the National League and the 70th at Wrigley Field. The Cubs finished fourth in the National League East with a record of 77–84. The season had opened with high hopes as the Cubs had won the NL East title the year before. However, injuries were a major factor as four of the Cubs' starting pitchers were on the disabled list at the same time.

Offseason
 November 28, 1984: Dennis Eckersley was signed as a free agent by the Chicago Cubs.
 December 4, 1984: Ron Hassey, Porfi Altamirano, Rich Bordi, and Henry Cotto were traded by the Chicago Cubs to the New York Yankees for Ray Fontenot and Brian Dayett.
 December 7, 1984: Steve Trout was signed as a free agent by the Cubs.
 January 3, 1985: Guy Hoffman was signed as a free agent by the Cubs.

Regular season
 Ryne Sandberg became the first Cub since 1969–1970 to score 100 runs in two consecutive seasons.

On June 11, the Cubs had a record of 35-19, and held a four game lead over the New York Mets for the division. However, Rick Sutcliffe, Steve Trout, Scott Sanderson and Dennis Eckersley all were injured, and the Cubs went on a 13-game losing streak that effectively eliminated them from contention. The Cubs ultimately finished seven games below .500 after having been 16 games above .500.
Shawon Dunston made his Major League debut. He struggled early on, so the Cubs sent him back to Iowa in early May. However, once he returned, it spelled the end for Larry Bowa, who was released in August and picked up by the New York Mets.

Season standings

Record vs. opponents

Notable transactions
 April 9, 1985: Jacob Brumfield was released by the Cubs.
May 12, 1985: Dave Hostetler was purchased by the Chicago Cubs from the Montreal Expos.

Draft picks
The Cubs drafted pitcher Dave Masters with the twenty-fourth overall pick in the 1985 Draft.
 June 3, 1985: Doug Dascenzo was drafted by the Chicago Cubs in the 12th round of the 1985 amateur draft. Player signed June 12, 1985.
 June 3, 1985: Mark Grace was drafted by the Cubs in the 24th round of the 1985 amateur draft. Player signed August 29, 1985.

Roster

Game log

|-  style="text-align:center; background:#bfb;"
|1||April 9|| Pirates||2 – 1 ||Sutcliffe (1-0)||Rhoden (0-1)||Smith (1)|| 34,551 ||1-0||
|-  style="text-align:center; background:#bfb;"
|2||April 11|| Pirates||4 – 1 ||Trout (1-0)||DeLeón (0-1)|||| 10,049 ||2-0||
|-  style="text-align:center; background:#fbb;"
|3||April 12|| Expos||5 – 1 ||Smith (1-0)||Eckersley (0-1)|||| 14,337 ||2-1||
|-  style="text-align:center; background:#bfb;"
|4||April 13|| Expos||8 – 3 ||Sanderson (1-0)||Rogers (0-2)|||| 32,212 ||3-1||
|-  style="text-align:center; background:#bfb;"
|5||April 14|| Expos||4 – 2 ||Sutcliffe (2-0)||Palmer (0-1)|||| 31,512 ||4-1||
|-  style="text-align:center; background:#bfb;"
|6||April 15|| Phillies||2 – 1 ||Trout (2-0)||K. Gross (0-1)||Smith (2)|| 8,347 ||5-1||
|-  style="text-align:center; background:#bfb;"
|7||April 16|| Phillies||1 – 0 10||Eckersley (1-1)||Holland (0-1)|||| 11,937 ||6-1||
|-  style="text-align:center; background:#bfb;"
|8||April 17|| Phillies||5 – 4 ||Frazier (1-0)||K. Gross (0-2)||Smith (3)|| 15,752 ||7-1||
|-  style="text-align:center; background:#fbb;"
|9||April 19||@ Expos||5 – 3 ||Smith (2-0)||Sutcliffe (2-1)||Reardon (2)|| 30,930 ||7-2||
|-  style="text-align:center; background:#fbb;"
|10||April 20||@ Expos||4 – 0 ||Gullickson (2-1)||Trout (2-1)||Reardon (3)|| 12,775 ||7-3||
|-  style="text-align:center; background:#bfb;"
|11||April 21||@ Expos||4 – 0 ||Eckersley (2-1)||Palmer (0-2)|||| 13,506 ||8-3||
|-  style="text-align:center; background:#fbb;"
|12||April 22||@ Pirates||5 – 3 ||McWilliams (1-1)||Ruthven (0-1)||Candelaria (3)|| 6,329 ||8-4||
|-  style="text-align:center; background:#bfb;"
|13||April 23||@ Pirates||5 – 0 ||Sutcliffe (3-1)||Bielecki (1-1)|||| 9,387 ||9-4||
|-  style="text-align:center; background:#bfb;"
|14||April 24||@ Pirates||5 – 2 ||Trout (3-1)||Rhoden (0-3)||Smith (4)|| 3,981 ||10-4||
|-  style="text-align:center; background:#bfb;"
|15||April 26||@ Phillies||7 – 3 ||Eckersley (3-1)||Koosman (0-1)|||| 27,187 ||11-4||
|-  style="text-align:center; background:#fbb;"
|16||April 27||@ Phillies||6 – 1 ||Rawley (3-0)||Sanderson (1-1)|||| 25,220 ||11-5||
|-  style="text-align:center; background:#fbb;"
|17||April 28||@ Phillies||3 – 2 ||K. Gross (2-2)||Sutcliffe (3-2)||Andersen (2)|| 31,890 ||11-6||
|-  style="text-align:center; background:#bfb;"
|18||April 30|| Giants||3 – 1 ||Trout (4-1)||Laskey (0-3)||Smith (5)|| 12,647 ||12-6||
|-

|-  style="text-align:center; background:#bfb;"
|19||May 1|| Giants||4 – 3 ||Eckersley (4-1)||Garrelts (0-1)|||| 14,490 ||13-6||
|-  style="text-align:center; background:#fbb;"
|20||May 3|| Padres||6 – 5 ||Hawkins (5-0)||Sutcliffe (3-3)||Gossage (7)|| 27,236 ||13-7||
|-  style="text-align:center; background:#bfb;"
|21||May 4|| Padres||12 – 8 ||Sorensen (1-0)||Booker (0-1)||Smith (6)|| 36,033 ||14-7||
|-  style="text-align:center; background:#bfb;"
|22||May 5|| Padres||6 – 3 ||Frazier (2-0)||DeLeón (0-2)|||| 36,388 ||15-7||
|-  style="text-align:center; background:#fbb;"
|23||May 6|| Dodgers||5 – 4 10||Howell (2-1)||Fontenot (0-1)|||| 20,796 ||15-8||
|-  style="text-align:center; background:#bfb;"
|24||May 7|| Dodgers||4 – 2 ||Ruthven (1-1)||Brennan (1-2)||Smith (7)|| 23,331 ||16-8||
|-  style="text-align:center; background:#bfb;"
|25||May 8||@ Giants||1 – 0 ||Sutcliffe (4-3)||Krukow (2-2)|||| 16,134 ||17-8||
|-  style="text-align:center; background:#fbb;"
|26||May 9||@ Giants||1 – 0 12||Garrelts (1-1)||Brusstar (0-1)|||| 11,825 ||17-9||
|-  style="text-align:center; background:#bfb;"
|27||May 10||@ Padres||6 – 2 ||Trout (5-1)||Hoyt (2-3)||Smith (8)|| 39,638 ||18-9||
|-  style="text-align:center; background:#fbb;"
|28||May 11||@ Padres||3 – 1 ||Show (4-2)||Eckersley (4-2)||Gossage (8)|| 54,395 ||18-10||
|-  style="text-align:center; background:#fbb;"
|29||May 12||@ Padres||5 – 3 ||Dravecky (2-2)||Ruthven (1-2)||Gossage (9)|| 50,226 ||18-11||
|-  style="text-align:center; background:#bfb;"
|30||May 14||@ Dodgers||8 – 3 ||Sutcliffe (5-3)||Valenzuela (3-4)|||| 48,187 ||19-11||
|-  style="text-align:center; background:#bfb;"
|31||May 15||@ Dodgers||3 – 2 ||Sanderson (2-1)||Honeycutt (2-3)||Smith (9)|| 46,213 ||20-11||
|-  style="text-align:center; background:#bfb;"
|32||May 17||@ Braves||7 – 5 ||Smith (1-0)||Sutter (2-1)|||| 20,901 ||21-11||
|-  style="text-align:center; background:#fbb;"
|33||May 18||@ Braves||4 – 3 ||Mahler (8-2)||Eckersley (4-3)||Sutter (7)|| 39,136 ||21-12||
|-  style="text-align:center; background:#fbb;"
|34||May 19||@ Braves||3 – 0 ||Bedrosian (1-2)||Sutcliffe (5-4)||Sutter (8)|| 30,389 ||21-13||
|-  style="text-align:center; background:#bfb;"
|35||May 20|| Reds||6 – 1 ||Sanderson (3-1)||Tibbs (3-6)|||| 21,231 ||22-13||
|-  style="text-align:center; background:#fbb;"
|36||May 21|| Reds||5 – 2 ||Hume (1-2)||Frazier (2-1)||Power (8)|| 32,007 ||22-14||
|-  style="text-align:center; background:#bfb;"
|37||May 22|| Reds||7 – 4 ||Eckersley (5-3)||Browning (4-3)||Smith (10)|| 27,863 ||23-14||
|-  style="text-align:center; background:#fbb;"
|38||May 24|| Astros||6 – 2 ||Ryan (4-2)||Ruthven (1-3)|||| 35,743 ||23-15||
|-  style="text-align:center; background:#bfb;"
|39||May 25|| Astros||5 – 4 ||Smith (2-0)||Ross (0-1)|||| 36,278 ||24-15||
|-  style="text-align:center; background:#bfb;"
|40||May 26|| Astros||10 – 8 ||Frazier (3-1)||Ross (0-2)||Smith (11)|| 37,044 ||25-15||
|-  style="text-align:center; background:#bfb;"
|41||May 27||@ Reds||4 – 3 ||Eckersley (6-3)||Browning (4-4)||Smith (12)|| 20,046 ||26-15||
|-  style="text-align:center; background:#fbb;"
|42||May 28||@ Reds||13 – 11 ||Franco (2-1)||Sorensen (1-1)|||| 15,121 ||26-16||
|-  style="text-align:center; background:#fbb;"
|43||May 29||@ Reds||1 – 0 ||Soto (7-3)||Ruthven (1-4)|||| 18,402 ||26-17||
|-  style="text-align:center; background:#bfb;"
|44||May 31||@ Astros||6 – 2 10||Smith (3-0)||Smith (4-2)|||| 33,440 ||27-17||
|-

|-  style="text-align:center; background:#bfb;"
|45||June 1||@ Astros||4 – 1 ||Eckersley (7-3)||Knepper (5-1)|||| 38,879 ||28-17||
|-  style="text-align:center; background:#fbb;"
|46||June 2||@ Astros||4 – 3 ||Scott (3-2)||Gura (0-1)||Smith (8)|| 21,129 ||28-18||
|-  style="text-align:center; background:#bfb;"
|47||June 4|| Braves||5 – 3 ||Ruthven (2-4)||Mahler (8-5)||Smith (13)|| 23,502 ||29-18||
|-  style="text-align:center; background:#fbb;"
|48||June 5|| Braves||4 – 2 11||Dedmon (3-0)||Smith (3-1)|||| 25,557 ||29-19|| According to the Cubs game footage shown in the 1986 movie, Ferris Bueller's Day Off, he took his day off on this day.
|-  style="text-align:center; background:#bfb;"
|49||June 6|| Pirates||3 – 2 12||Brusstar (1-1)||Holland (1-3)|||| 22,368 ||30-19||
|-  style="text-align:center; background:#bfb;"
|50||June 7|| Pirates||1 – 0 ||Sutcliffe (6-4)||DeLeón (1-8)|||| 37,414 ||31-19||
|-  style="text-align:center; background:#bfb;"
|51||June 8|| Pirates||7 – 3 ||Trout (6-1)||McWilliams (3-4)|||| 35,232 ||32-19||
|-  style="text-align:center; background:#bfb;"
|52||June 9|| Pirates||5 – 1 ||Ruthven (3-4)||Winn (1-1)||Brusstar (1)|| 36,475 ||33-19||
|-  style="text-align:center; background:#bfb;"
|53||June 10||@ Expos||5 – 4 ||Fontenot (1-1)||Reardon (2-2)||Smith (14)|| 42,218 ||34-19||
|-  style="text-align:center; background:#bfb;"
|54||June 11||@ Expos||5 – 3 ||Frazier (4-1)||St. Claire (1-1)||Smith (15)|| 28,303 ||35-19||
|-  style="text-align:center; background:#fbb;"
|55||June 12||@ Expos||2 – 0 ||Palmer (5-5)||Sutcliffe (6-5)||Reardon (18)|| 10,378 ||35-20||
|-  style="text-align:center; background:#fbb;"
|56||June 13||@ Expos||9 – 7 ||Smith (7-2)||Trout (6-2)||Reardon (19)|| 14,210 ||35-21||
|-  style="text-align:center; background:#fbb;"
|57||June 14|| Cardinals||11 – 10 ||Andújar (12-1)||Ruthven (3-5)||Forsch (1)|| 36,745 ||35-22||
|-  style="text-align:center; background:#fbb;"
|58||June 15|| Cardinals||2 – 0 ||Cox (8-2)||Fontenot (1-2)|||| 34,716 ||35-23||
|-  style="text-align:center; background:#fbb;"
|59||June 16|| Cardinals||5 – 2 ||Kepshire (3-5)||Eckersley (7-4)||Campbell (3)|| 36,262 ||35-24||
|-  style="text-align:center; background:#fbb;"
|60||June 17||@ Mets||2 – 0 ||Darling (6-1)||Sutcliffe (6-6)|||| 41,986 ||35-25||
|-  style="text-align:center; background:#fbb;"
|61||June 18||@ Mets||5 – 1 ||Lynch (4-3)||Trout (6-3)|||| 41,125 ||35-26||
|-  style="text-align:center; background:#fbb;"
|62||June 19||@ Mets||1 – 0 ||Gooden (10-3)||Sanderson (3-2)|||| 51,778 ||35-27||
|-  style="text-align:center; background:#fbb;"
|63||June 20||@ Mets||5 – 3 ||Fernandez (2-4)||Fontenot (1-3)||McDowell (4)|| 37,203 ||35-28||
|-  style="text-align:center; background:#fbb;"
|64||June 21||@ Cardinals||7 – 5 ||Kepshire (4-5)||Eckersley (7-5)||Lahti (5)|| 46,005 ||35-29||
|-  style="text-align:center; background:#fbb;"
|65||June 22||@ Cardinals||2 – 1 10||Dayley (1-0)||Smith (3-2)|||| 49,231 ||35-30||
|-  style="text-align:center; background:#fbb;"
|66||June 23||@ Cardinals||7 – 0 ||Tudor (6-7)||Ruthven (3-6)|||| 45,881 ||35-31||
|-  style="text-align:center; background:#fbb;"
|67||June 25|| Mets||3 – 2 ||Gooden (11-3)||Sanderson (3-3)|||| 36,730 ||35-32||
|-  style="text-align:center; background:#bfb;"
|68||June 26|| Mets||7 – 3 ||Fontenot (2-3)||McDowell (5-3)||Smith (16)|| 35,876 ||36-32||
|-  style="text-align:center; background:#bfb;"
|69||June 27|| Mets||4 – 2 ||Sutcliffe (7-6)||Darling (6-2)|||| 35,857 ||37-32||
|-  style="text-align:center; background:#bfb;"
|70||June 28||@ Pirates||5 – 0 ||Trout (7-3)||DeLeón (2-10)|||| 16,432 ||38-32||
|-  style="text-align:center; background:#fbb;"
|71||June 29||@ Pirates||6 – 5 15||Reuschel (5-1)||Frazier (4-2)|||| 13,934 ||38-33||
|-  style="text-align:center; background:#bfb;"
|72||June 30||@ Pirates||9 – 2 ||Sanderson (4-3)||Robinson (2-3)|||| 31,384 ||39-33||
|-

|-  style="text-align:center; background:#bfb;"
|73||July 1||@ Phillies||3 – 1 ||Fontenot (3-3)||Denny (5-6)||Smith (17)|| 23,091 ||40-33||
|-  style="text-align:center; background:#fbb;"
|74||July 2||@ Phillies||11 – 2 ||Rawley (6-6)||Sutcliffe (7-7)|||| 23,005 ||40-34||
|-  style="text-align:center; background:#bfb;"
|75||July 3||@ Phillies||4 – 3 ||Smith (4-2)||Tekulve (4-3)|||| 56,092 ||41-34||
|-  style="text-align:center; background:#fbb;"
|76||July 4|| Giants||6 – 4 ||Garrelts (3-3)||Trout (7-4)||Minton (2)|| 34,377 ||41-35||
|-  style="text-align:center; background:#fbb;"
|77||July 5|| Giants||12 – 6 ||Blue (5-2)||Sanderson (4-4)|||| 38,766 ||41-36||
|-  style="text-align:center; background:#fbb;"
|78||July 6|| Giants||6 – 4 ||Garrelts (4-3)||Smith (4-3)||M. Davis (5)|| 35,902 ||41-37||
|-  style="text-align:center; background:#bfb;"
|79||July 7|| Giants||6 – 5 ||Brusstar (2-1)||M. Davis (3-6)||Smith (18)|| 35,663 ||42-37||
|-  style="text-align:center; background:#fbb;"
|80||July 8|| Padres||8 – 4 ||Stoddard (1-3)||Sorensen (1-2)|||| 33,159 ||42-38||
|-  style="text-align:center; background:#bfb;"
|81||July 9|| Padres||7 – 3 ||Trout (8-4)||Show (7-6)||Frazier (1)|| 33,095 ||43-38||
|-  style="text-align:center; background:#bfb;"
|82||July 10|| Padres||4 – 3 ||Sanderson (5-4)||Dravecky (8-5)||Smith (19)|| 35,042 ||44-38||
|-  style="text-align:center; background:#fbb;"
|83||July 11|| Dodgers||3 – 1 ||Welch (3-1)||Fontenot (3-4)||Howell (9)|| 35,469 ||44-39||
|-  style="text-align:center; background:#fbb;"
|84||July 12|| Dodgers||7 – 4 ||Niedenfuer (4-2)||Smith (4-4)|||| 36,029 ||44-40||
|-  style="text-align:center; background:#fbb;"
|85||July 13|| Dodgers||9 – 1 ||Valenzuela (10-8)||Gura (0-2)|||| 34,822 ||44-41||
|-  style="text-align:center; background:#bfb;"
|86||July 14|| Dodgers||10 – 4 ||Frazier (5-2)||Honeycutt (6-8)||Brusstar (2)|| 34,273 ||45-41||
|-  style="text-align:center; background:#fbb;"
|87||July 18||@ Giants||1 – 0 ||Krukow (6-7)||Frazier (5-3)|||| 9,908 ||45-42||
|-  style="text-align:center; background:#bfb;"
|88||July 19||@ Giants||4 – 3 ||Sorensen (2-2)||Gott (4-7)||Smith (20)|| 12,887 ||46-42||
|-  style="text-align:center; background:#bfb;"
|89||July 20||@ Giants||2 – 1 ||Ruthven (4-6)||Hammaker (3-9)||Smith (21)|| 15,494 ||47-42||
|-  style="text-align:center; background:#fbb;"
|90||July 21||@ Giants||2 – 1 ||Laskey (3-11)||Gura (0-3)||Minton (3)|| 22,073 ||47-43||
|-  style="text-align:center; background:#bfb;"
|91||July 22||@ Padres||5 – 3 ||Meridith (1-0)||Jackson (0-1)||Smith (22)|| 23,873 ||48-43||
|-  style="text-align:center; background:#bfb;"
|92||July 23||@ Padres||8 – 1 ||Sutcliffe (8-7)||Hawkins (12-3)|||| 34,278 ||49-43||
|-  style="text-align:center; background:#bfb;"
|93||July 24||@ Padres||4 – 3 10||Smith (5-4)||Stoddard (1-4)||Frazier (2)|| 30,175 ||50-43||
|-  style="text-align:center; background:#fbb;"
|94||July 25||@ Dodgers||7 – 3 ||Valenzuela (12-8)||Fontenot (3-5)||Howell (10)|| 49,516 ||50-44||
|-  style="text-align:center; background:#fbb;"
|95||July 26||@ Dodgers||10 – 0 ||Reuss (8-6)||Ruthven (4-7)|||| 41,321 ||50-45||
|-  style="text-align:center; background:#fbb;"
|96||July 27||@ Dodgers||5 – 4 ||Hershiser (11-3)||Frazier (5-4)||Howell (11)|| 46,092 ||50-46||
|-  style="text-align:center; background:#bfb;"
|97||July 28||@ Dodgers||9 – 2 ||Sorensen (3-2)||Powell (0-1)||Brusstar (3)|| 47,571 ||51-46||
|-  style="text-align:center; background:#fbb;"
|98||July 30|| Cardinals||11 – 3 ||Kepshire (8-6)||Engel (0-1)|||| 33,083 ||51-47||
|-  style="text-align:center; background:#bfb;"
|99||July 31|| Cardinals||5 – 2 ||Fontenot (4-5)||Andújar (17-5)||Smith (23)|| 31,417 ||52-47||
|-

|-  style="text-align:center; background:#bfb;"
|100||August 1|| Cardinals||9 – 8 14||Frazier (6-4)||Dayley (3-1)|||| 36,164 ||53-47||
|-  style="text-align:center; background:#bfb;"
|101||August 2|| Mets||2 – 1 ||Eckersley (8-5)||Leach (1-1)||Brusstar (4)|| 35,419 ||54-47||
|-  style="text-align:center; background:#fbb;"
|102||August 3|| Mets||5 – 4 10||Orosco (3-4)||Frazier (6-5)||McDowell (9)|| 36,775 ||54-48||
|-  style="text-align:center; background:#fbb;"
|103||August 4|| Mets||4 – 1 ||Gooden (17-3)||Fontenot (4-6)|||| 35,207 ||54-49||
|-  style="text-align:center; background:#fbb;"
|104||August 5|| Mets||7 – 2 ||Lynch (9-5)||Botelho (0-1)|||| 34,167 ||54-50||
|-  style="text-align:center; background:#fbb;"
|105||August 8||@ Cardinals||8 – 0 ||Tudor (14-8)||Sanderson (5-5)|||| 39,203 ||54-51||
|-  style="text-align:center; background:#fbb;"
|106||August 9||@ Mets||6 – 4 ||McDowell (6-4)||Brusstar (2-2)|||| 44,309 ||54-52||
|-  style="text-align:center; background:#fbb;"
|107||August 10||@ Mets||8 – 3 ||Gooden (18-3)||Fontenot (4-7)|||| 48,306 ||54-53||
|-  style="text-align:center; background:#fbb;"
|108||August 11||@ Mets||6 – 2 ||Lynch (10-5)||Botelho (0-2)|||| 40,311 ||54-54||
|-  style="text-align:center; background:#bfb;"
|109||August 12|| Expos||8 – 7 ||Gumpert (1-0)||Reardon (2-5)||Smith (24)|| 28,195 ||55-54||
|-  style="text-align:center; background:#fbb;"
|110||August 13|| Expos||4 – 1 ||Hesketh (10-5)||Sanderson (5-6)||Reardon (30)|| 28,582 ||55-55||
|-  style="text-align:center; background:#fbb;"
|111||August 14|| Expos||8 – 7 ||Smith (14-4)||Sorensen (3-3)||Burke (5)|| 30,055 ||55-56||
|-  style="text-align:center; background:#fbb;"
|112||August 15|| Expos||7 – 3 ||Gullickson (11-8)||Engel (0-2)|||| 29,553 ||55-57||
|-  style="text-align:center; background:#bfb;"
|113||August 16|| Phillies||6 – 5 ||Smith (6-4)||Tekulve (4-8)|||| 31,557 ||56-57||
|-  style="text-align:center; background:#fbb;"
|114||August 17|| Phillies||10 – 4 ||Denny (8-9)||Sorensen (3-4)|||| 31,421 ||56-58||
|-  style="text-align:center; background:#fbb;"
|115||August 18|| Phillies||9 – 5 ||Hudson (6-11)||Baller (0-1)||Tekulve (13)|| 31,269 ||56-59||
|-  style="text-align:center; background:#bfb;"
|116||August 20||@ Braves||5 – 2 ||Fontenot (5-7)||Sutter (7-6)||Smith (25)|| 13,006 ||57-59||
|-  style="text-align:center; background:#bfb;"
|117||August 21||@ Braves||9 – 5 ||Brusstar (3-2)||Garber (3-4)||Smith (26)|| 12,245 ||58-59||
|-  style="text-align:center; background:#bfb;"
|118||August 22||@ Braves||3 – 2 ||Meridith (2-0)||Camp (2-6)||Smith (27)|| 11,273 ||59-59||
|-  style="text-align:center; background:#fbb;"
|119||August 23||@ Reds||3 – 2 ||Franco (11-1)||Sorensen (3-5)|||| 34,283 ||59-60||
|-  style="text-align:center; background:#bfb;"
|120||August 24||@ Reds||4 – 0 ||Frazier (7-5)||Soto (10-15)||Smith (28)|| 37,069 ||60-60||
|-  style="text-align:center; background:#fbb;"
|121||August 25||@ Reds||5 – 3 ||Browning (13-9)||Brusstar (3-3)||Franco (7)|| 35,038 ||60-61||
|-  style="text-align:center; background:#bfb;"
|122||August 26||@ Astros||10 – 4 ||Engel (1-2)||Knepper (10-10)|||| 9,557 ||61-61||
|-  style="text-align:center; background:#fbb;"
|123||August 27||@ Astros||11 – 4 ||Smith (7-5)||Meridith (2-1)|||| 10,810 ||61-62||
|-  style="text-align:center; background:#fbb;"
|124||August 28||@ Astros||3 – 0 ||Ryan (9-11)||Baller (0-2)||Heathcock (1)|| 6,979 ||61-63||
|-  style="text-align:center; background:#fbb;"
|125||August 29|| Braves||9 – 6 ||Mahler (17-12)||Sorensen (3-6)||Camp (2)|| 16,965 ||61-64||
|-  style="text-align:center; background:#fbb;"
|126||August 30|| Braves||8 – 1 ||Johnson (2-0)||Fontenot (5-8)|||| 15,920 ||61-65||
|-  style="text-align:center; background:#bfb;"
|127||August 31|| Braves||5 – 4 11||Brusstar (4-3)||Garber (5-5)|||| 31,876 ||62-65||
|-

|-  style="text-align:center; background:#bfb;"
|128||September 1|| Braves||15 – 2 ||Botelho (1-2)||Barker (2-7)|||| 31,427 ||63-65||
|-  style="text-align:center; background:#fbb;"
|129||September 2|| Astros||7 – 2 ||Dawley (3-2)||Baller (0-3)|||| 26,620 ||63-66||
|-  style="text-align:center; background:#fbb;"
|130||September 3|| Astros||8 – 7 10||Smith (8-5)||Frazier (7-6)|||| 11,306 ||63-67||
|-  style="text-align:center; background:#fbb;"
|131||September 4|| Astros||11 – 6 ||Scott (15-7)||Meridith (2-2)|||| 9,136 ||63-68||
|-  style="text-align:center; background:#fbb;"
|132||September 5||@ Cardinals||6 – 1 ||Cox (15-8)||Engel (1-3)|||| 33,693 ||63-69||
|-  style="text-align:center; background:#fbb;"
|133||September 6|| Reds||7 – 5 ||Soto (12-15)||Botelho (1-3)|||| 17,026 ||63-70||
|-  style="text-align:center; background:#bfb;"
|134||September 7|| Reds||9 – 7 ||Baller (1-3)||Franco (11-2)|||| 30,300 ||64-70||
|-  style="text-align:center; background:#bbb;"
|135||September 8|| Reds||5 – 5 |||||||| 28,269 ||64-70||
|-  style="text-align:center; background:#bfb;"
|136||September 9||@ Cardinals||3 – 1 ||Fontenot (6-8)||Kepshire (10-9)||Meridith (1)|| 32,808 ||65-70||
|-  style="text-align:center; background:#fbb;"
|137||September 10||@ Pirates||2 – 1 ||Reuschel (12-7)||Engel (1-4)|||| 3,133 ||65-71||
|-  style="text-align:center; background:#bfb;"
|138||September 11||@ Pirates||3 – 1 ||Meridith (3-2)||DeLeon (2-17)||Baller (1)|| 5,432 ||66-71||
|-  style="text-align:center; background:#fbb;"
|139||September 12||@ Pirates||10 – 2 ||Rhoden (9-13)||Eckersley (8-6)||Robinson (3)|| 3,439 ||66-72||
|-  style="text-align:center; background:#fbb;"
|140||September 13|| Cardinals||9 – 3 ||Forsch (7-6)||Trout (8-5)||Worrell (1)|| 16,110 ||66-73||
|-  style="text-align:center; background:#fbb;"
|141||September 14|| Cardinals||5 – 4 ||Campbell (5-3)||Sorensen (3-7)||Lahti (17)|| 29,852 ||66-74||
|-  style="text-align:center; background:#fbb;"
|142||September 15|| Cardinals||5 – 1 ||Cox (16-9)||Engel (1-5)|||| 28,430 ||66-75||
|-  style="text-align:center; background:#fbb;"
|143||September 16||@ Expos||8 – 5 ||Burke (9-3)||Frazier (7-7)|||| 10,399 ||66-76||
|-  style="text-align:center; background:#bfb;"
|144||September 17||@ Expos||3 – 0 ||Eckersley (9-6)||Youmans (3-3)||Smith (29)|| 12,095 ||67-76||
|-  style="text-align:center; background:#fbb;"
|145||September 18||@ Mets||4 – 2 ||Aguilera (8-6)||Trout (8-6)||McDowell (15)|| 25,424 ||67-77||
|-  style="text-align:center; background:#fbb;"
|146||September 19||@ Mets||5 – 1 ||Fernandez (7-9)||Fontenot (6-9)|||| 26,812 ||67-78||
|-  style="text-align:center; background:#bfb;"
|147||September 20||@ Phillies||3 – 1 ||Patterson (1-0)||Hudson (7-12)||Smith (30)|| 20,207 ||68-78||
|-  style="text-align:center; background:#bfb;"
|148||September 21||@ Phillies||9 – 2 ||Abrego (1-0)||K. Gross (14-11)|||| 17,779 ||69-78||
|-  style="text-align:center; background:#bfb;"
|149||September 22||@ Phillies||9 – 2 ||Eckersley (10-6)||Rawley (12-8)|||| 21,768 ||70-78||
|-  style="text-align:center; background:#fbb;"
|150||September 23|| Expos||10 – 7 ||St. Claire (5-3)||Frazier (7-8)||Burke (8)|| 4,647 ||70-79||
|-  style="text-align:center; background:#fbb;"
|151||September 24|| Expos||17 – 15 ||Smith (17-5)||Fontenot (6-10)||Reardon (36)|| 6,947 ||70-80||
|-  style="text-align:center; background:#bfb;"
|152||September 25|| Mets||5 – 4 ||Smith (7-4)||Orosco (6-6)|||| 10,339 ||71-80||
|-  style="text-align:center; background:#fbb;"
|153||September 26|| Mets||3 – 0 ||Gooden (23-4)||Abrego (1-1)|||| 11,091 ||71-81||
|-  style="text-align:center; background:#bfb;"
|154||September 27|| Phillies||9 – 7 ||Baller (2-3)||Tekulve (4-10)||Smith (31)|| 9,258 ||72-81||
|-  style="text-align:center; background:#bfb;"
|155||September 28|| Phillies||11 – 10 ||Eckersley (11-6)||Denny (11-13)||Smith (32)|| 27,875 ||73-81||
|-  style="text-align:center; background:#bfb;"
|156||September 29|| Phillies||6 – 2 ||Trout (9-6)||Toliver (0-3)|||| 26,641 ||74-81||
|-

|-  style="text-align:center; background:#bfb;"
|157||October 1|| Pirates||4 – 3 ||Patterson (2-0)||Reuschel (14-8)||Smith (33)|| 3,446 ||75-81||
|-  style="text-align:center; background:#fbb;"
|158||October 2|| Pirates||9 – 4 ||Rhoden (10-14)||Sutcliffe (8-8)||Guante (5)|| 4,637 ||75-82||
|-  style="text-align:center; background:#bfb;"
|159||October 3|| Pirates||13 – 5 ||Perlman (1-0)||Winn (3-6)||Engel (1)|| 7,437 ||76-82||
|-  style="text-align:center; background:#fbb;"
|160||October 4||@ Cardinals||4 – 2 ||Forsch (9-6)||Eckersley (11-7)||Worrell (5)|| 40,618 ||76-83||
|-  style="text-align:center; background:#fbb;"
|161||October 5||@ Cardinals||7 – 1 ||Tudor (21-8)||Trout (9-7)|||| 44,825 ||76-84||
|-  style="text-align:center; background:#bfb;"
|162||October 6||@ Cardinals||8 – 2 ||Patterson (3-0)||Andújar (21-12)|||| 43,665 ||77-84||
|-

Player stats

Batting

Starters by position 
Note: Pos = Position; G = Games played; AB = At bats; H = Hits; Avg. = Batting average; HR = Home runs; RBI = Runs batted in

Other batters 
Note: G = Games played; AB = At bats; H = Hits; Avg. = Batting average; HR = Home runs; RBI = Runs batted in

Pitching

Starting pitchers 
Note: G = Games pitched; IP = Innings pitched; W = Wins; L = Losses; ERA = Earned run average; SO = Strikeouts

Other pitchers 
Note: G = Games pitched; IP = Innings pitched; W = Wins; L = Losses; ERA = Earned run average; SO = Strikeouts

Relief pitchers 
Note: G = Games pitched; W = Wins; L = Losses; SV = Saves; ERA = Earned run average; SO = Strikeouts

Farm system 

LEAGUE CHAMPIONS: Winston-Salem

References

1985 Chicago Cubs at Baseball Reference
1985 Chicago Cubs on Baseball Almanac

Chicago Cubs seasons
Chicago Cubs season
Chicago